NH 114 may refer to:

 National Highway 114 (India)
 New Hampshire Route 114, United States